A list of films produced by the Ollywood film industry and released in theaters in 2018.

References 

Lists of 2018 films by country or language

Lists of Ollywood films by year